Bradley Phillip Bell (born June 29, 1964) is an American television writer and producer. Bell is an eight-time Daytime Emmy Award winner and is executive producer and head writer for The Bold and the Beautiful, an American soap opera.

Early life and education
Bradley Bell was born in Chicago, Illinois, the son of William J. Bell and Lee Phillip Bell. Bell's parents co-created the soap operas The Young and the Restless and The Bold and the Beautiful. His mother was also an Emmy Award-winning broadcast journalist and talk show personality. Bell graduated from the Latin School of Chicago before attending the University of Colorado at Boulder  and the University of Wisconsin at Madison. He concluded his studies at University of California, Los Angeles where he majored in television production before going on to join the writing staff of The Young and the Restless.

Career
In 1987, Bell contributed to the creation and launch of The Bold and the Beautiful, currently the world's most popular daytime television soap opera with more than 45 broadcasters in over 110 countries,  according to the Guinness Book of World Records. Bell was promoted to associate producer in 1989 and again to supervising producer in 1992. He has been the head writer and executive producer of the show since 1993 and 1995 respectively.

Awards

It wasn’t until 2000 that Bradley Bell received his first Daytime Emmy Award nomination. By 2015, he has been awarded with Emmys for his writing in 2010, 2013, 2015 amongst 11 nominations  (2000, 2003, 2006, 2007, 2008, 2009, 2010, 2011, 2013, 2014, 2015)  and took home three statuettes for helming the Best Drama Series in a record three consecutive years in 2009, 2010, 2011 amongst 9 nominations (2003, 2004, 2007, 2009, 2010, 2011, 2013, 2014, 2015) in addition to two Emmy wins in other categories (new approaches and music composition).

On January 14, 2015 CBS Television City, celebrating 7000 episodes of The Bold and The Beautiful, dedicated Studio 31 to Bell in honor of his work since the first day of the series.

Personal life
Bell married Colleen Bell (née Bradley) in October 1991 and they have 4 children. They live in Holmby Hills, Los Angeles, California. According to the Center for Investigative Reporting, Bradley and Colleen Bell use "at least 2 million" gallons of water per year to irrigate their personal estate.

Bell's sister, Lauralee Bell  is an actress best known for her role as Christine Blair on The Young and the Restless and The Bold and the Beautiful. Bell also has an older brother, William J. Bell, the president of Bell Dramatic Serial Company and Bell-Phillip Television Productions, Inc.

Head writer

Executive producer

References

External links

Bradley Bell on TV.com

American soap opera writers
1964 births
Latin School of Chicago alumni
Living people
Soap opera producers
People from Holmby Hills, Los Angeles